Yeleninsky is a rural locality (a village) in Iglinsky Selsoviet, Iglinsky District, Bashkortostan, Russia. The population was 13 as of 2010. There is 1 street.

Geography 
Yeleninsky is located 5 km north of Iglino (the district's administrative centre) by road. Starye Karashidy is the nearest rural locality.

References 

Rural localities in Iglinsky District